Wallers is a commune in the Nord department in northern France.

It is known for the Trench of Arenberg, part of the Paris–Roubaix cycling race, held annually in April.

Heraldry

Population

See also
Communes of the Nord department

References

Communes of Nord (French department)